Gurrufío is the Venezuelan term for a button whirligig or buzzer, a simply constructed traditional children’s toy. 
It consists of a central disk of wood, plastic or metal (even occasionally a soft drink bottle cap that has been hammered flat), with holes drilled or nailed equidistant and close to the center. A piece of string is inserted through both holes, leaving a length of about 15 to 30 centimeters on each side, and the loop is closed with a knot.

How to play
Take the ends of the loop at both sides with the fingers, rotate the disk a bit, and draw the rope taut, fast, and release the tension a bit. The disk will then spin in one direction, reach its maximum, and, helped by another yank, start spinning in the opposite direction.

References

External links
 Moraiba Tibisay Pozo, Juegos Infantiles Residenciales Populares Tradicionales de Venezuela: Aproximación a un Inventario. Propuesta Preliminar de Clasificación y Estadísticas, Centro de Investigaciones Socioculturales de Venezuela (CISCUVE).

Children's games
Traditional toys
Venezuelan folklore